The Ancient Bath House of Nazareth was discovered in the late 1990s by Elias and Martina Shama during renovations inside their shop near Mary's Well in Nazareth. Archaeologists that examined the bath house have assigned its construction to various periods, the oldest of these being the Greek or Roman period in Palestine.

History of Discovery 
In the late 1990s, a local Nazareth couple, Elias and Martina Shama discovered pipes in their wall, and a portion of a tunnel.  Digging through the wall, they discovered underground passages that, upon further digging revealed a vast underground complex. According to Under Nazareth, Secrets in Stone (Dec 17, 2002, International Herald Tribune):

“Shama called in the Antiquities Authority whose officers told him he had found an Ottoman bathhouse, little more than a century old and of minimal interest. So Shama continued digging out the storage room and the cellar under his shop. After three years Shama had unearthed a beautiful high-vaulted room where he offered visitors coffee before guiding them through the hypocaust, the underfloor heating channels, to see the remains of a white marble floor supported by tile columns meeting in a complex array of arches.

The story might have ended there but for Shama's unshakable conviction that his discovery was no legacy from the Turkish invaders. A deeply religious Christian Arab, he was plagued by dreams of Jesus sitting in his bathhouse. He visited neighboring ancient sites to make comparisons. The Antiquities Authority's verdict seemed more and more implausible to him.

He found an ally in a senior archaeologist, Tzvi Shacham of Tel Aviv's Antiquities Museum, who visited the shop and advised the authority that Shama had found a much rarer bathhouse, from the Crusader period and some 1,000 years old.” 

A North American research team conducted high-resolution ground penetrating radar (GPR) surveys at a number of locations in and around Mary’s Well in 2004-5 to determine appropriate locations for further digging to be conducted beneath the bathhouse. Samples were collected for radio-carbon dating and the initial data from GPR readings seem to confirm the presence of additional subterranean structures.

In 2003, archaeologist Richard Freund stated his belief that the site was clearly of Roman-era origins: ""I am sure that what we have here is a bathhouse from the time of Jesus," he says, "and the consequences of that for archaeology, and for our knowledge of the life of Jesus, are enormous."

Carbon 14 dating was done on 3 samples of charcoal, each was found to come from a very different time period, indicating the bath house had been used in multiple periods, and at least was used sometime between 1300-1400, although with only 3 samples dated, it is possible for the bath house to be older.

References

External links 
 Official Bath House Website

Former public baths
Buildings and structures in Nazareth
Public baths in the Arab world